Most Ven Aggamaha Panditha Napane Pemasiri Thero also spelt either as Napane Premasiri Thero or Napane Pemasiri Thero(2 January 1922/1923 – 17 November 2020) was a Sri Lankan Sinhalese Buddhist monk. He served as the 13th head of the Ramanna Nikaya since September 2012 and also served as the chief incumbent of Menikhinna Hurikaduwa Vidyasagara Privena. He was ordained on 8 July 1933.

On 3 September 2012, he was appointed as the 13th Maha Nayaka of the Ramanna Nikaya succeeding Weweldeniye Medhalankara Thero who died in August 2012. On August 16, 2019, Pemasiri and Koṭugoḍa Dhammāvāsa Thera presided over the union of the Amarapura and Rāmañña monastic orders, creating the Amarapura–Rāmañña Nikāya; both monks jointly headed the new order. Napane Pemasiri Thero died on 17 November 2020 at the age of 98 while receiving treatment at the Peradeniya Teaching Hospital. The funeral ceremony was held at Bandaranaike National school grounds, Kundasale on 22nd November 2020. The funeral proceedings were held with full state honors.

References 

1920s births
2020 deaths
Sri Lankan Buddhist monks
Sri Lankan Theravada Buddhists
20th-century Buddhist monks
21st-century Buddhist monks